Divi or DIVI may refer to:
 A form of Dweep (disambiguation), the Sanskrit word for 'island', found in words Aminidivi , as well as in obsolete spellings of Maldives as 'Maldivi'
 dIVI Translation, a dual stateless IPv4/IPv6 translation technique
 A premium WordPress Theme and standalone WordPress plugin from Elegant themes that allows users to build websites using the visual drag-and-drop Divi page builder.

See also
Div (disambiguation)
Dive (disambiguation)